Cosmopterix kurilensis is a moth in the family Cosmopterigidae. It was described by Sinev in 1985. It is found in Japan.

References

Natural History Museum Lepidoptera generic names catalog

Moths described in 1985
kurilensis